Richard Fulton Moore (San Bernardino August 11, 1910 – Newport Beach November 16, 2005) was a sailor from the United States of America, who represented his country at the 1932 Summer Olympics in Los Angeles.

References

External links
 
 
 

1910 births
2005 deaths
American male sailors (sport)
Olympic gold medalists for the United States in sailing
Sailors at the 1932 Summer Olympics – 8 Metre
Medalists at the 1932 Summer Olympics